Puotila metro station is a ground-level cut-and-cover metro station on the M1 line of the Helsinki Metro. There are 200 bicycle and 331 car parking spaces at Puotila. It serves the neighborhoods of Puotila and Puotinharju in East Helsinki.

The station was opened on 31 August 1998, making it one of the newest stations in the Helsinki Metro. It was designed by the architect bureau Kaupunkisuunnittelu Oy Jarmo Maunula. It is located 1 kilometer from the Itäkeskus, and 2 kilometers from Rastila.

Pictures

References

External links

Helsinki Metro stations
Railway stations opened in 1998
1998 establishments in Finland